Bjørn Andersen (31 May  1931 – 25 August 2006) was a Danish athlete. He competed in the men's pole vault at the 1960 Summer Olympics.

References

External links
 

1931 births
2006 deaths
Athletes (track and field) at the 1960 Summer Olympics
Danish male pole vaulters
Olympic athletes of Denmark
Place of birth missing